Central Cotton Research Institute Multan, established in 1970 in Multan, Pakistan, is one of the renowned  research institutes of Pakistan. The institute has many divisions dedicated to different aspects of cotton research including Agronomy, Breeding and Genetics, Cytogenetics, Physiology, Fiber Technology, Statistics and Agricultural Engineering.
Over the years, many achievements have been made in the development of high yielding varieties with standard fibre quality characteristics like staple length, fineness and strength etc. Enhancing cotton productivity has been greatly impacted by the fine-tuning of production technology from the grassroots level of the common farming community to the progressive farmers.

At the time of establishment of the Institute in 1970, the cotton productivity was 370 kg per hectare which has now risen to the level of 772 kg per hectare during the current year. The continuous and untiring research endeavors of the scientists have yielded 20 cotton varieties (17 Non-Bt and 03 Bt). The introduction of efficient water use technologies i.e. bed-furrow sowing technique, identification of water stress & heat tolerant cotton varieties and other water saving techniques were advocated to the farmers to economize cotton production. 
Salient features of five new varieties viz. CIM-612, Cyto-124, Bt.CIM-600, Bt.CIM-616 and Bt.Cyto-177 were presented in the 71st Meeting of the Expert Sub Committee held at Ayub Agricultural Research Institute, Faisalabad on 09.03.2015. Apart from having up to the standard fibre quality traits, Bt.CIM-600 is tolerant to heat stress whereas Bt.CIM-616, CIM-612 and Bt.Cyto-177 are highly CLCuV tolerant with promising yield potential.

The Institute has made tremendous efforts in popularizing the technology for herbicide use in weed management. The continuous research on screening of weedicides and fine tuning of their application techniques (pre- and post-emergence) is another milestone of this Institute. The quantification of optimized fertilizer levels, application methodologies for efficient utilization and exploring the alternate nutrient sources remained as a continuous endeavor to achieve yield sustainability. The technique of plant mapping, disseminated from this Institute, for forecasting/ estimating yield potential is being practiced by the various research, academia and government departments. 
In the field of plant protection, the invasion of secondary pests like mealybug, dusky cotton bug and red cotton bug are becoming potential threats to achieve yield targets. A due attention is being made to devise pest management strategies to tackle these emerging pests. In the scenario of extended Bt cotton cultivation, the research has been diverted towards this new dimension for controlling sucking pests and studies on resistance management accrued due to inbuilt bollworm resistance in cotton plant. 
The country has suffered huge financial losses due to yield reduction in cotton crop caused by the wide scale infestation of cotton leaf curl virus (CLCuV) disease. Accepting this hard challenge, the scientists at the Institute were able to evolve varieties through introgression that have a high degree of tolerance to CLCuV. A variety Cyto-124, which is recently recommended by Expert Sub Committee, has shown its stability towards virus tolerance in early as well as late sowing (March to June planting). A couple of more promising genotypes (Cyto-120 & Cyto-122) are in pipeline. The contribution in the development of disease resistance is the outcome of continuous involvement by the Pathology Section for quantification and transformation of resistant character and its build up in the new genetic material.

The development of new varieties is based on the maintenance of high fibre quality traits to cope with the standards of the textile industry. The varieties released by the Institute are stable and maintain their fibre quality under various ecological zones. The Institute is at advanced level in developing transgenic cotton through classical breeding along with biotechnological tools. Results of the data gathered from the experiments and surveys cannot be deduced or inferred without the statistical analysis. The mass scale statistical analysis of data has made success to bring out this 44th Progress Report of the Institute. The results are not confined in the four-walls of the Institute. Message dissemination measures through print and electronic media, personal communication, training of farmers, field staff of seed, fertilizer and NGOs remained a regular phenomena throughout the year. Various programs are televised through TV channels based at Multan.

Plant breeding and genetics 
The main focus of the scientists of Breeding and Genetics Section, CCRI, Multan is to develop and commercialize Bt. and non-Bt. new cotton varieties with inbuilt resistance/tolerance against the biotic and abiotic stresses along with desirable fibre traits. Development of germplasm has a key role in the process of variety development. This section holds its own recognition in this aspect. Two Bt. varieties Bt. CIM-600, Bt. CIM-616 and one non Bt. Variety CIM-612 were submitted for approval to Expert Sub-Committee. Six advanced Bt. strains were evaluated at Multan and Khanewal locations. The new strain Bt.CIM-616 gave best performance at both the locations. The strain had the lint percentage of 41.7 with the staple length of 28.8 mm and micronaire of 4.7 µg inch-1. The fibre strength of the strain is very good up to 100.3 . Seven advanced non-Bt. strains were also evaluated at Multan and Khanewal locations. The new strain CIM-716 produced the highest seed cotton yield on overall basis. All these strains have the desirable fibre characteristics. The crosses with exotic material (AS-0349) from France and Mac-7 for induction of CLCuD resistant/tolerance are in different filial generations.

Cytogenetics 
The intent was to travel around the possibilities of transferring enviable genes of the wild species to the cultivated cotton for commercial exploitation and to study inter and intra-genomic relationships in the genus Gossypium. The research work of Cytogenetics Section encompass maintenance of Gossypium germplasm to develop promising varieties, through introgression, which are resistant/tolerant to biotic (diseases) and abiotic (drought, heat) stresses with special hub on Burewala Strain of cotton leaf curl virus. Cytological studies of a newly developed inter-specific hybrid was undertaken. The material industrial through multiple species hybridization viz F7 of [{2(G.hirs.x G.anom.) x 3G.hirs.} x {2 (G.arbo. x G.anom.) x 2G.hirs.}] x G. hirs. were sown in single lines. Out of the 286 families 90 families remained free from virus under field conditions throughout the entire cotton season. Conversion of CLCuD tolerant lines in transgenic lines using back cross method is under observation in different filial generations i.e. F1, F2, F3, F4 and F5.
Different shades of brown cotton were observed in F2. Grey colour is also found in this material. All these shades have suitable fibre length. Search for aneuploids especially haploids remained in steps forward. Cyto material developed through multiple species hybridization was tested in progeny row trials, micro-varietal trials, Micro varietal trials and ZVT to observe their economic and fibre characteristics.
Bt Cyto-177and Cyto-124 (non Bt), varieties developed through introgression has been sent for recommendation to Expert Sub Committee on 9 March 2015. Both lines have completed two years in NCVT, PCCT, ZVT and DGR trials for its wider adaptability in different ecological zones. Cyto-179 will be tested in NCVT, PCCT and ZVT trials for its wider adoptability in different ecological zones.

Agronomy  
Cotton agronomy fixes special significance in utilizing natural resources in the best available management techniques for achieving higher productivity in certain agro-ecological zones. The research carried out showed that planting of cotton in the second week of April is the best choice for achieving higher production. The delaying in planting time results in the successive decrease in yield. Genotypes CIM-608 produced higher yield over CIM-620 and Cyto-124. Application of 200 kg N ha-1 to non Bt. cotton gave non significant increase in seed cotton yield over 150 kg N ha-1. The research findings showed that planting of transgenic cotton on 1 March produced the highest yield as compared to other planting dates i.e. 15 March, 1 April, 15 April, 1 & 15 May. Genotype Bt.CIM-616 produced significantly higher seed cotton yield as compared to Bt.Cyto-177 and Bt.CIM-598 (std). Nitrogenous fertilizer @ 400 kg ha-1 produced significantly higher seed cotton yield in transgenic cotton over 300 kg N ha-1.
The result revealed that cotton planting as relay crop (75 cm apart rows) produced maximum seed cotton yield (4618 kg ha-1) than fallow land early planting (4086 kg ha-1). Planting of cotton under modified technique (Relay crop 75 cm apart rows) produced 13, 99.5 and 105.3% higher cotton yield over fallow land, wide row (150 cm) and after wheat harvesting, respectively. The cost of production for the year 2014-15 was Rs. 73907 ac-1.

Entomology  
Plant protection strategy and activities have significant importance in the overall crop production programmes for sustainable agriculture. Variation of Bt gene expression in different cultivars over time and efficacy to bollworms are the main concern nowadays, studies undertaken on Earias spp proved the concerned. Similarly the efficacy of Bt cotton in the field is losing efficacy against the pink bollworm, survey conducted revealed high infestations in green bolls. Monitoring of lepidopterous pest population viz sex pheromone and light traps was carried out and forecast the increasing trend in all bollworms population. Studies on red and dusky cotton bugs continued and efforts are made to find bio agents for long term solutions. Seed treatment effect and development of natural on early and normal planting studies revealed that the population of jassid was more on early sown field than normal sowing also the natural fauna was recorded higher in the early sown. The distinct efforts of researchers of the section have proved meaningful in devising pest management strategies against common and new emerging insect pests through application of IPM. Studies are continued on host plant tolerance of CCRI, Multan and National Coordinated Bt. & non-Bt. Strains. The section also studied effect of different IPM strategies on insect pest for transgenic cotton. Screening of new insecticides was also conducted against major insect pests of cotton.

Fiber technology 
Fibre Technology section was established in 1976. The prime objective of Fibre Technology section is to provide technical support to Plant Breeding & Cytogenetics sections in testing of fibre characteristics and spinning potential of newly developed cotton cultivars & strains and facilitates the other sections of the institute as well, to investigate the effect of different agricultural practices on fibre characteristics. The section is extending services to other cotton research stations of PCCC, Government & private cotton agencies, commercial organizations, textile industry, progressive growers and providing research facilities and technical support to the research scholars from various textile institutes and universities in fibre testing and spinning of their research material. Apart from lab work, the section is also contributes in collaborative research studies with different sections of the institute. 
Testing Facilities
Fibre technology section is equipped with sophisticated and scientific fibre testing instruments and micro-spinning facility.

Plant pathology  
The admirable collaboration and cooperation provided by this Section to Plant Breeding & Genetics and Cytogenetics disciplines has overlaid in the development of virus resistance varieties. The survey during the crop season revealed that virus was prevalent across the belt. However under various agronomic practices and change in weather conditions CLCuD ranged from 0-100 percent. The incidence of stunting and boll rot was minimal. The material tested under VT, MVT. NCVT (Bt & Non-Bt), NBCT, PCCT (Bt & Non-Bt), and SVT were found susceptible, at various intensity levels, to CLCuD except one strains, which showed resistance. One thousand fifty US-germplasm tested under field condition, only 114 accessions show resistant against CLCuD. The cultivation of cotton of Bt-cotton in March and non-Bt in mid April escaped from virus to some extent while the crop planted beyond May fell prey to virus attack. The pattern of appearance of CLCuD and its progression during the crop season differed greatly with planting dates. The low incidence of the disease was due to planting of CIM-616 and Cyto-124. The fortnightly incidence of disease when compare with weather parameters i.e. average maximum temperature from 35.2 to 36.8 °C minimum temperature from 27.4 to 29.5 °C and relative humidity in the range of 71.2 to 81.4% at peak of CLCuD which helps for fortnightly increase of CLCuD, during mid-June to mid-August. Pantoa agglomerans reduces the seed quality and quantity in cotton rotted bolls. Streptomycin at different doses found effective to control this bacteria. Seed rottening decreased with increase of soil temperature and fungicide (Dynasty) gave minimum seed rottening in all sowing dates.

Plant physiology 
This section was established in 1970 with the aim to conduct basic research on physiology and nutrition of cotton crop. Since its establishment, the main focus of research scientists has been on the screening of cotton strains/varieties for thermal and water stress tolerance, integrated nutrient management, fertilizer application strategies to improve nutrient use efficiency and fertilizer use economics, soil health improvement, amino acids and growth regulators, biosafety studies of Bt cotton and seed physiology. The scientists of the section try their best to increase cotton production by managing the soil, plant and seed related problems through a coordinated approach. Apart from the allocated experimental area for field trials, the Physiology/Chemistry Section has well equipped laboratories for qualitative and quantitative studies such as pH and EC meters, flame photometers, double beam spectrophotometer, atomic absorption spectrophotometer, ICP, HPLC, GC’s, pressure chamber for leaf water potential, Osmometer, Photosynthesis measuring system, Micro Kjeldahl apparatus, centrifuges, water baths, hot plate, Soxhlet’s apparatus, Muffle furnace and sample grinding machines etc.

Statistics 
Statistics section is assigned the job of helping other sections in designing layout for trials and analysis of the research data. This facility is also provided to all research stations established by PCCC. Lay out for National Coordinated Variety Trials (NCVT) are prepared for Directorate of Research. Data of NCVT are statistically analyzed for Director Research, PCCC, Multan. Daily market rates of cotton commodities are documented.

Transfer of technology 
Transfer of Technology Section played a significant role in the dissemination of latest research practices/findings for profitable cotton production technology to all private and public sectors. The research findings are disseminated with the usage of electronic and print media during the cropping season and also in the off-season. Training/refresher courses were conducted for knowledge enhancement and skill development farmers and field officers of pesticide/seed industry. Cotton Crop Management Group (CCMG) Meetings were regularly held at the institute that helped in reviewing cotton crop situation and the devise of measures which should be adopted at gross root level through the intervention of Agriculture Department. A large number of printed materials were distributed among the extension workers, farmers and visitors of the institute during the season. Furthermore, a number of programs for general awareness/skill development in cotton production were taken up through Radio & TV programs.

Cotton varieties

See also
 List of think tanks in India
 Central Institute for Cotton Research (India)

References

External links 
 

Science and technology in Punjab, Pakistan
Research institutes in Pakistan
Agricultural research institutes
Cotton organizations
Agricultural organisations based in Pakistan